Error in the System is the first English album by German singer Peter Schilling, and is the English counterpart to the German album Fehler im System. The English and German version have been combined and sold as a single box set in several parts of the world.

Singles
The English version contains the song "Major Tom (Coming Home)", which reached the top 15 in New Zealand and the US, and the top 50 in the UK. The German version includes the songs "Major Tom (Völlig losgelöst)", which reached number one in Germany, Austria and Switzerland and number two on the Dutch Top 40, as well as "Die Wüste lebt". Because "Major Tom (Coming Home)" was his one and only entry into the top 40 on the US charts, he is generally considered a one-hit wonder in that country.

Track listing

Error in the System

Side one
 "Only Dreams" (Schilling, David Lodge) – 3:22
 "Lifetime Guarantee" (Schilling, Lodge, Armin Sabol) – 6:20
 "The Noah Plan" (Schilling, Lodge) – 4:21
 "Error In The System" (Schilling, Matthew Garey) – 3:35
 "Fast Alles Konstruiert" (Schilling, Lodge, Armin Sabol) – 6:20 (cassette only)
 "Major Tom (Völlig Losgelöst)" (Schilling, Lodge) – 4:08 (cassette only)

Side two
 "Major Tom (Coming Home)" (Schilling, Lodge) – 5:03
 "Major Tom, Part II" (Sabol) – 3:35
 "(Let's Play) U.S.A." (Schilling, Sabol, Garey) – 3:18
 "I Have No Desire" (Schilling, Garey) – 3:22
 "Stille Nacht, Heilige Nacht" (Silent Night, Holy Night; trad.; arr. Sabol/Schilling) – 3:26
 "Dann Trügt Der Schein" (Schilling, David Lodge) – 3:22 (cassette only)
 "Die Wüste Lebt" (Schilling, Lodge) – 4:21 (cassette only)

Fehler im System

Side one
 "…Dann trügt der Schein" (Schilling) – 3:28
 "Fast alles konstruiert" (Sabol, Schilling) – 6:48
 "Die Wüste lebt" (Schilling) – 4:56
 "Fehler im System" (Schilling) – 3:30

Side two
 "Major Tom (Völlig losgelöst)" (Schilling) – 4:59
 "Major Tom" (Sabol, Schilling) – 3:50
 "U.S.A." (Sabol, Schilling) – 3:22
 "Ich hab' keine Lust" (Schilling) – 3:31
 "Stille Nacht, heilige Nacht" (trad.; arr. Sabol, Schilling) – 3:30

Personnel

Musicians
Peter Schilling – all vocals
Armin Sabol – guitars (all tracks), additional bass (on "Stille Nacht, Heilige Nacht")
Rolf Kersting – bass (all tracks except "Major Tom")
Gunther Gebauer – bass (on "Major Tom")
Frank Hieber – keyboards (all tracks except "Major Tom")
Gonzo Bishop – keyboards (on "Major Tom")
Dicky Tarrach – drums, percussion (all tracks except "The Noah Plan" and "Major Tom")
Mickie Stickdorn – drums, percussion (on "The Noah Plan")
Curt Cress – drums, percussion (on "Major Tom")

Production
Produced by Peter Schilling and Armin Sabol
Recorded and engineered by Frank Reinke, Geoff Peacy, Lars Hidde, Manfred Lohse, Peter Schilling and Peter Schmidt
Track 5 mixed by Holger J. Magnussen; all other tracks mixed by Frank Reinke
Art direction – Bob Defrin
Front cover photo – Gesine Petter
Back cover photo – Job Crogier

Charts

Certifications

References

External links

1983 debut albums
Peter Schilling albums
Elektra Records albums
Warner Music Group albums